Bob Humphreys (March 30, 1936 – September 16, 2022) was a retired male track and field athlete from the United States. He competed in the men's discus throw and the shot put event during his career. His career highlight was a gold medal in the discus at the 1963 Pan American Games, setting a Pan Am Record at time.
He later went on to compete in masters athletics and took a bronze medal in the 1987 World Championship weight pentathlon.  Humphreys currently holds a M60 and a M70 SCA Masters Meet Record from a 1996 and 2006 meet.  Humphreys currently holds a M40 Masters West Region Meet Region from a 1977 meet.  Humphreys is in the Long Beach City College Hall of Fame. Humphreys formerly held the Masters M40 US Record for the 2.0 kg Discus throw (1976)

Personals bests
Shot Put — 17.88 metres (Los Angeles, May 20, 1960)
Discus Throw — 62.00 metres (Long Beach, July 14, 1962)

External Link
Bob Humphreys - World Athletics

References

 trackfield.brinkster

1936 births
Living people
American male discus throwers
American male shot putters
Pan American Games gold medalists for the United States
Pan American Games track and field athletes for the United States
Athletes (track and field) at the 1963 Pan American Games
Track and field athletes from California
Pan American Games medalists in athletics (track and field)
Medalists at the 1963 Pan American Games
American masters athletes